Donald Welbourn FREng was an English engineer, and a pioneer of computer-aided design and computer-aided manufacturing (CAD/CAM) research and development in the United Kingdom.

Early life
Welbourn was educated at Emmanuel College, Cambridge (BA 1937), and became a University Lecturer in 1952.

CAD/CAM
Welbourn was a key pioneer of CADCAM research and development in the UK. After initial work at Cambridge, Lord Caldecote, chairman of the Delta Group plc, persuaded him to help the group.  This help led to the formation Delcam in 1989.

Personal life
Welbourn was married to Esther, Fellow of New Hall, Cambridge, predeceased him in 2001. He leaves a daughter, Ann, and a son, Hugh.

References

Additional sources 
 Donald Welbourn
 https://web.archive.org/web/20111106061744/http://www.delcam.com/general/about/history.asp

Fellows of Selwyn College, Cambridge
English civil engineers
Fellows of the Royal Academy of Engineering
2009 deaths
1916 births